Rosey Edeh (born August 16, 1966) is a Canadian television personality, who was a news anchor for Global News at Noon on Global Toronto and senior reporter for ET Canada. She is currently C.E.O. of Micha Muse Media and has directed her debut film  Oliver Jones: Mind Hands Heart. She is currently a morning co-anchor for CTV Morning Live Ottawa.

Biography
Edeh was born in London, England. She was a weather presenter, providing weather forecasts on CFCF in Montreal, before moving to the United States to work for CNN and most recently, a weathercaster on NBC's Early Today and MSNBC.

Her running skills led to an athletic scholarship at Rice University in Houston, Texas, where she began to establish herself as a world-class 400-metre hurdler. After her 100-metre hurdle time was considered one of the best athletes to come to Rice and was inducted into the Rice Hall of Fame. At the time of her induction she was ranked sixth in the world. Being one of Rice's best female runners she received five time All America. A resident of Lasalle, Quebec, she competed at the Olympic Games in 1988, 1992 and 1996. She won a bronze medal at the 1990 Commonwealth Games as a member of the 4 x 400 metre relay team, and was part of the gold medal-winning 4 x 400 metre relay team, at the 1992 World Cup of Track and Field.

In the 400-metre hurdles final at the 1996 Summer Olympics Edeh set a Canadian national record time that stood over 23 years, until broken by Sage Watson in 2019.

In July 2016 her daughter Micha Powell was named to Canada's Olympic team as an alternate.

In September 2020, Rosey became a co-anchor of the CTV Morning News Live Ottawa.

References

External links
 Rosey joins Ottawa Morning News Live.
 Rosey Edeh's bio from ET Canada.
 
 
 
 
 
 
 

1966 births
Living people
Canadian female hurdlers
Athletes (track and field) at the 1988 Summer Olympics
Athletes (track and field) at the 1992 Summer Olympics
Athletes (track and field) at the 1996 Summer Olympics
Athletes from Montreal
Black Canadian track and field athletes
Black Canadian broadcasters
Rice Owls women's track and field athletes
Canadian television meteorologists
Olympic track and field athletes of Canada
Sportspeople from London
Canadian people of Nigerian descent
Canadian infotainers
People from LaSalle, Quebec
Anglophone Quebec people
Global Television Network people
Black Canadian sportswomen
Athletes (track and field) at the 1990 Commonwealth Games
Commonwealth Games bronze medallists for Canada
Commonwealth Games medallists in athletics
World Athletics Championships athletes for Canada
Universiade medalists in athletics (track and field)
Universiade silver medalists for Canada
Medalists at the 1989 Summer Universiade
Medallists at the 1990 Commonwealth Games